Stefania Cicali (born 20 October 1987) is an Italian sprint canoer and marathon canoeist who competed in the late 2000s. At the 2008 Summer Olympics in Beijing, she finished eighth in the K-4 500 m event while being eliminated in the semifinals of the K-2 500 m event.

References

External links
 

1987 births
Living people
People from Bagno a Ripoli
Canoeists at the 2008 Summer Olympics
Canoeists of Fiamme Azzurre
Italian female canoeists
Olympic canoeists of Italy
World Games silver medalists
Competitors at the 2013 World Games
Sportspeople from the Metropolitan City of Florence